A.M.P. Suranga Adikari is a Sri Lankan athlete who was the national champion in the 400 m hurdles in 2004.

Biography
Suranga Adikari (born 22 September 1979) from Kurunegala, Sri Lanka. Studied at Narammala Mayurapadha National college

He is a Buddhist.

International events and achievements
2002- 14th Asian Athletic Championships, 400m Hurdles – participated
2003 – 1st Sri Lanka International Open Athletic Championship 400m Hurdles – Bronze medal
2004- 9th SAF games, 400m Hurdles – silver medal

National achievements
400m Hurdles
2002/2003/2004 – Sri Lanka colours man.
2002 – National Athletic Championship – Silver Medal
2003 – National Athletic Championship – Bronze Medal
2004 – National Athletic Championship – Gold Medal
2004 – National Athletic Championship, Best Athlete Duncan White Trophy
2002–2006 National Athletic pool – participated

References

Living people
Sri Lankan male hurdlers
Year of birth missing (living people)
South Asian Games silver medalists for Sri Lanka
South Asian Games medalists in athletics